The Wordie Creek Formation is a geologic formation in Greenland. The Triassic Sediments from the region were first discovered in 1926 and preserve fossils dating back to the Triassic period. The temnospondyl Selenocara is from this formation.

See also

 List of fossiliferous stratigraphic units in Greenland

References
 

Triassic Greenland